The Kharkiv KhAI-3 or Aviavnito-3 was one of several Soviet mid-1930s motor glider transports intended to reduce transport costs.

Design and development

Alexandr Alekseyevich Lazerev, who led the Kharkiv KhAI-3 Avianvito design team, already knew some of the problems posed by tailless aircraft. He was on the team which designed the almost uncontrollable KhAI-4 two years before (the Institute's designs did not always appear in their numerical order). That aircraft made only three flights before being grounded as dangerous.

It was a tailless aircraft with a broad-chord wing and with a  tractor engine, fin and rudder all on the centreline. Though there were initial thoughts of mounting the KhAI-3's Shvetsov M-11 five cylinder radial engine on a pylon over the wing, it was finally placed ahead of the leading edge on steel tubes from the front wing spar and fed from four tanks in the central wing. There was a long, six seat cabin on either side of the centreline with the pilot in the forward portside seat. The large, triangular fin mounted a broad, round-topped rudder.

Its central wing panel was rectangular in plan, with a steel tube structure including four spars  and dural skinning. The outer panels, 82% of the span, were all-wood structures with dihedral and sweep on the leading edge only, giving an overall sweep of 16° at quarter-chord;. They decreased in thickness outwards from 14% to 7%, with 8° washout. Each wing carried three control surfaces. Near each tip, close behind and parallel to the leading edge there was a large, rectangular plan interceptor. These were operated differentially by pedals which also controlled the rudder and were used to make flat turns. Inboard of the interceptors, each outer panel trailing edge carried two broad-chord control surfaces that acted as both ailerons and elevators.

The Kharkiv KhAI-3 had a fixed, tailwheel undercarriage. Its forward-mounted engine and propeller allowed a short tailwheel to provide a ground angle of attack of 15°, avoiding one of the problems encountered with the KhAI-4.

It was named after Sergei Kirov.

Operational history

The first flight was made on 14 September 1936. On this occasion the front seats of both cabins were equipped with dual controls; the pilots were V. A. Borodin and E. I. Schwartz. During this and subsequent flights, controlled turns proved difficult however the various control surfaces were combined. A long development programme yielded significant improvements.

The 1937 Aviavnito-8 was a proposed but unflown development with the same passenger capacity, dimensions and engine.

Specifications

References

Tailless aircraft
Twin-fuselage aircraft
Kharkiv Aviation Institute aircraft
Aircraft first flown in 1936
1930s Soviet airliners